Roda de Berà is a municipality in the comarca of the Tarragonès in Catalonia, Spain. It is situated on the coast in the east of the comarca. The Roman Via Augusta ran through the municipality, and a triumphal arch survives in the middle of the present N-340 coast road.

There is a RENFE railway station in the west of the municipality.

There is a new marina and a small village in various architectural styles.

References

 Panareda Clopés, Josep Maria; Rios Calvet, Jaume; Rabella Vives, Josep Maria (1989). Guia de Catalunya, Barcelona: Caixa de Catalunya.   (Catalan).  (Spanish).

External links

 Government data pages 

Municipalities in Tarragonès
Populated places in Tarragonès